Luis Tapia may refer to:

Luis Ernesto Tapia (born 1944), retired Panamanian soccer player
Cancha de Entrenamiento Luis Tapia, a soccer stadium in Panama
Luis Castellanos Tapias, Colombian historian
Luis Tapia (artist), an American sculptor